Amata chlorometis is a species of moth of the subfamily Arctiinae first described by Edward Meyrick in 1886. It is found in New South Wales, Australia.

References 

chlorometis
Moths of Australia